HOFF SA is a Norwegian agricultural cooperative processing and distributing potato produce. The company is owned by 4,000 farmers and has plants in Inderøy (Sundnes Brenneri), Gjøvik, Brumunddal, and Klepp. The company processes one third of the potato production in the country.

The main products are frozen, fresh and canned potatoes, including french fries, potato starch flour and potato chips. Other products include oil, spice, onion and akvavit. In total the company produces about 100 products.

History
The first industrialized production with potato started in 1848 when private distilling of liquor was banned. In 1879 Brennerienes Forening was created, as the first sector to be organised as a cooperative in the country, already dating back to the 1840s. Potato flour became an industrial product in the late 1800s, though not until 1941 was Potetmelfabrikkenes Salgskontor created as a cooperative. These two merged in 1981 to create Norske Potetindustrier that changed name to HOFF Norske Potetindustrier in 1994 when the local distilleries and production plants were merged with the distribution offices.

Agricultural cooperatives in Norway
Food and drink companies established in 1879
Food and drink companies of Norway
Starch companies
Norwegian companies established in 1879